Sandy Ridge & Clear Lake Railway is a private,  gauge ridable miniature railway located on  of mostly wooded hills near Battle Creek in the state of Michigan. The railroad was built and owned by John "Jack" Ozanich, who was a retired locomotive engineer of the Grand Trunk Railroad. Jack died on May 29, 2020. 

The railroad runs through rolling landscape, with grades of up to 5.2% on the mainline and 75ft minimum radius curves. The branch lines have switch backs and even steeper grades to change elevation rapidly.

The rolling stock used on the railroad is modelled in  inches per foot (5:16) scale to resemble the  narrow gauge locomotives, freight cars, coaches, and cabooses used by the Sandy River & Rangeley Lakes Railroad in the state of Maine.

Rolling Stock

External links 
 Sandy Ridge & Clear Lake Railway Website
 Images from the SR&CL Railway

7½ in gauge railways in the United States
Rail transportation in Michigan